The Miryalaguda honour killing refers to the murder of Pranay Kumar, a 23-year-old Indian man from the marginalized Christian community, who had married a woman outside his caste. Kumar was murdered on 14 September 2018 in Miryalaguda, Telangana, India, in front of his 23-year old wife, Amrutha Varshini, who was five months pregnant.

Thousands attended Kumar's funeral following his murder. A justice website was created, and a candlelight vigil was announced with support from the members of the Telugu film industry.

References

2018 murders in India
Allegations of honor killing
Caste-related violence in India
Crime in Telangana
Honor killing victims
Honour killing in India
Violence against men in Asia
Filicides